Jesse-Juho Kuusisto (born 27 March 1991) is a Finnish football player who currently plays for Tampere United in the Finnish Veikkausliiga.

References
Guardian Football

Living people
1991 births
Finnish footballers
Tampere United players
Association football defenders